Christian Günther III of Schwarzburg-Sondershausen (24 June 1736 – 14 October 1794) was the ruling Prince of Schwarzburg-Sondershausen from 1758 until his death.  Some authors call him Prince Christian Günther I, because he was the first ruler of Schwarzburg-Sondershausen named Christian Günther who held the title of Prince.  Others call Christian Günther III, because there were two earlier Counts by that name.

Life 
Christian Günther III was the son of Prince August I of Schwarzburg-Sondershausen (1691-1750) and his wife Princess Charlotte Sophie (1696-1762), a daughter of Prince Charles Frederick of Anhalt-Bernburg.

He succeeded as the ruling Prince of Schwarzburg-Sondershausen after the death of his uncle Henry XXXV in 1758, because Henry XXXV was unmarried and had no children, and Christian Günther III's father had already died in 1750.

He had to deal with a number of problems when he inherited the principality.  Some people were abusing their power, and the country suffered from the consequences of the Seven Years' War.  Although he was only 22 years old, he managed to solve these problems with unwearying zeal and vigorous energy.

He was considered a frugal ruler and father.  He used the money he saved to construct some important buildings.  He expanded his residence Sondershausen Palace by extending the north wing and added the famous "Blue Hall" to the west wing.  He also built very large so-called "domain" buildings in Allmenhausen and Sondershausen and the watchtower on the top of Mount Possen, in the Hainleite range.  His favourite castle was Ebeleben Castle, where he grew up.  He expanded this castle, and completely overhauled the adjoining park.  The statues, waterfalls, fountains and flowers made it a renowned park for a long time.

He died in 1794, at the age of 59, and was succeeded by his eldest son, Günther Frederick Charles I.

Marriage and issue 
On 4 February 1760, Christian Günther III married Charlotte Wilhelmine (1737-1777), a daughter of Prince Victor Frederick II of Anhalt-Bernburg.  They had the following children:
 Günther Frederick Charles I (1760-1837), his successor
 Catharina Charlotte Friederike Albertine (1761-1801), married in 1790 to Prince Frederick Charles Albert of Schwarzburg-Sondershausen
 Günther Albert August (1767-1833)
 Caroline Auguste Albertine (1769-1819), Deaness in Herford
 Albertine Wilhelmine Amalie (1771-1829), married in 1795 to Duke Ferdinand Frederick of Württemberg (1763-1834), divorced in 1801
 John Charles Günther (1772-1842)

References 
 Friedrich Apfelstedt: Das Haus Kevernburg-Schwarzburg von seinem Ursprunge bis auf unsere Zeit, 
 Dr. Kamill von Behr: Genealogie der in Europa regierenden Fürstenhäuser, Leipzig, 1870

Princes of Schwarzburg-Sondershausen
House of Schwarzburg
1736 births
1794 deaths
18th-century German people